Sherene Pinnock (born 30 March 1987, in St. Catherine) is a Jamaican 400 metres hurdles runner.

Her personal best is 56.67 seconds, achieved at the 2006 World Junior Championships in Beijing.

Achievements

External links
 

1987 births
Living people
People from Saint Catherine Parish
Jamaican female hurdlers